J41 may refer to:
 British Aerospace Jetstream J41, a British airliner
 County Route J41 (California)
 Elongated pentagonal gyrocupolarotunda, a Johnson solid (J41)